Michael 'Mike' Noel Manypenny II (born August 1, 1959 in East Liverpool, Ohio) is an American politician and a former Democratic member of the West Virginia House of Delegates. Manypenny served in the House of Delegates from 2009 until January 2015; he represented District 42 prior to 2013 and District 49 from 2013 to 2015. In 2016, Manypenny ran for Congress in West Virginia's 1st congressional district, but was defeated by Republican incumbent David McKinley.

Education
Manypenny earned his BS in agriculture and forestry from West Virginia University.

U.S. House of Representatives

Elections

2016 Election 
Manypenny decided to run in West Virginia's 1st congressional district in 2015.  He faced no opponent in the Primary election.  He is running against three-term incumbent Republican David McKinley who was also uncontested in his primary election.

Elections
2004 When District 42 Democratic Representative Tom Coleman left the Legislature and left the seat open, Manypenny ran in the three-way 2004 Democratic Primary but lost to Diane Parker, who lost the November 2, 2004 General election to Republican nominee Jeff Tansill.
2006 To challenge Representative Tansill, Manypenny was unopposed for the 2006 Democratic Primary but lost the November 7, 2006 General election to Representative Tansill.
2008 When District 42 Democratic Representative Tansill left the Legislature and left the seat open, Manypenny ran in the May 13, 2008 Democratic Primary and placed first with 2,390 votes (67.2%), and was unopposed for the November 4, 2008 General election, winning with 5,913 votes.
2010 Manypenny and former Representative Tansill were both unopposed for their May 11, 2010 primaries, setting up a rematch of their 2006 contest; Manypenny won the November 2, 2010 General election with 3,223 votes (54.2%) against former Representative Tansill.
2012 Redistricted to District 49, and with incumbent Representative Gary Howell redistricted to District 56, Manypenny was challenged in the May 8, 2012 Democratic Primary but won with 1,801 votes (72.2%), and won the November 6, 2012 General election with 3,453 votes (53.1%) against former Republican Representative Jeff Tansill in their third contest.
2014 Manypenny was defeated by Republican Amy Summers in 2014.

References

External links
Official page at the West Virginia Legislature
Michael Manypenny at Ballotpedia
Mike Manypenny at the National Institute on Money in State Politics

1959 births
Living people
Democratic Party members of the West Virginia House of Delegates
People from East Liverpool, Ohio
People from Grafton, West Virginia
West Virginia University alumni